"Oh Cecilia (Breaking My Heart)" is a 2014 single by British pop band The Vamps, with a chorus adapted from Simon & Garfunkel's 1970 hit "Cecilia". The song appeared on their debut studio album Meet the Vamps (2014), but a later version featuring vocals from Canadian singer Shawn Mendes was released on 12 October 2014 as the album's fifth single.

The song has charted in Australia, Ireland, New Zealand, Scotland, South Africa, and the United Kingdom (where it peaked at number 9, becoming the group's fifth successive top 10 single), whilst the version featuring Shawn Mendes charted in Ireland, New Zealand and South Africa.

Background
"Oh Cecilia (Breaking My Heart)", which is a pop song, is an adaptation of Simon & Garfunkel's 1970 hit song "Cecilia", with interpolated sampling occurring throughout the song. The verse lyrics do not follow those of the original song, though they still heavily rely on the main chorus (Cecilia, you're breaking my heart / You're shaking my confidence daily / Oh Cecilia I'm down on my knees / I'm begging you please to come home).

Music video
Two music videos exist for the song. One of them features the Vamps and Mendes shipwrecked in an area they don't initially realise is already inhabited, sending out an SOS and then bolting upon sight of a plane, and the other is in support of charity and features famous faces.

Track listing
Digital download
"Oh Cecilia (Breaking My Heart)"  – 3:14
"Hurricane" – 3:19
Digital download
"Oh Cecilia (Breaking My Heart)"  – 3:23
CD edition
"Oh Cecilia (Breaking My Heart) (Live from the O2 Arena)" – 3:16
"Teenagers" – 2:40
"Dear Maria, Count Me In/Sugar We're Going Down (Medley)" – 2:53
"Girls On TV (Live from the O2 Arena)" – 3:40

Charts

Certifications

References

2014 songs
The Vamps (British band) songs
Shawn Mendes songs
Songs written by Paul Simon
Songs written by Espen Lind
Songs written by Amund Bjørklund
Songs written by K'naan